The St. Lucie Mets are a Minor League Baseball team of the Florida State League and the Single-A affiliate of the New York Mets. They are located in Port St. Lucie, Florida, and play their home games at Clover Park. The Mets have been members of the Florida State League since their founding in 1988. They originally competed at the Class A level before being elevated to Class A-Advanced in 1990. Since the 2021 season, the Mets have been a Low Single-A affiliate.

They have won the Florida State League championship six times (1988, 1996, 1998, 2003, 2006, and 2022).

Playoffs
2022: Defeated Palm Beach 2–0 in semifinals; defeated Dunedin 2–0 to win championship.
2016: Lost to Bradenton 2–0 in semifinals.
2012: Lost to Jupiter 2–1 in semifinals.
2011: Defeated Bradenton 2–1 in semifinals; lost to Daytona 3–1 in finals.
2007: Lost to Brevard County 2–1 in semifinals.
2006: Defeated Palm Beach 2–0 in semifinals; defeated Dunedin 3–0 to win championship.
2003: Defeated Jupiter 2–0 in semifinals; defeated Dunedin 3–1 to win championship.
2000: Lost to Daytona 2–0 in semifinals.
1998: Defeated Jupiter 2–0 in semifinals; defeated Tampa 3–2 to win championship.
1996: Defeated Vero Beach 2–0 in semifinals; defeated Clearwater 3–1 to win championship.
1993: Defeated Lakeland 2–1 in semifinals; lost to Clearwater 3–1 in finals.
1992: Lost to Osceola 2–0 in quarterfinals.
1991: Defeated Sarasota 2–1 in quarterfinals; lost to Clearwater 2–1 in semifinals.
1990: Lost to Vero Beach 2–1 in quarterfinals.
1989: Lost to Charlotte 2–1 in semifinals.
1988: Defeated Lakeland 2–1 in quarterfinals; defeated Tampa 2–0 in semifinals; defeated Osceola 2–0 to win championship.

Roster

Notable alumni

Baseball Hall of Fame alumni

Gary Carter (2006, MGR) Inducted, 2003
Pedro Martinez (2007-2008) Inducted, 2015
Mike Piazza Inducted, 2016

Notable alumni

Rick Aguilera (1988) 3 x MLB All-Star
Edgardo Alfonzo (1992)(2010, MGR) MLB All-Star
Moises Alou (2008) 6 x MLB All-Star
Jason Bay (2002, 2011–2012) 3 x MLB All-Star; 2004 NL Rookie of the Year
Heath Bell (2000) 3 x MLB All-Star
Carlos Beltran (2010) 9 x MLB All-Star; 1999 AL Rookie of the Year
Jeromy Burnitz (1990) MLB All-Star
Mike Cameron (2005) MLB All-Star
Luis Castillo (2010) 3 x MLB All-Star
Yoenis Cespedes (2016) 2 x MLB All-Star
Endy Chavez (2005, 2007)
Vince Coleman (1992) 2 x MLB All-Star; 1985 NL Rookie of the Year
Tony Clark (2003) MLB All-Star
David Cone (2003) 5 x MLB All-Star; 1994 NL Cy Young Award
Michael Cuddyer (2015) 2 x MLB All-Star; 2013 NL Batting Title
Jacob deGrom 3 x MLB All-Star; 2014 NL Rookie of the Year; 2018 NL ERA Title; 2018 NL Cy Young Award
Octavio Dotel (1995-1997)
Sid Fernandez (1991, 1993) MLB All-Star
Cliff Floyd (2004, 2006) MLB All-Star
John Franco (2003) 4 x MLB All-Star
Darryl Hamilton (2000)
Pete Harnisch (1996-1997) MLB All-Star
Matt Harvey (2011) MLB All-Star
Keith Hernandez (1989) 5 x MLB All-Star; 1979 NL Most Valuable Player
Orlando Hernandez (2008)
Todd Hundley (1988, 1998) 2 x MLB-All Star
Clint Hurdle (1988-1989, MGR) 2013 NL Manager of the Year
Jason Isringhausen (1994, 1997) 2 x MLB All-Star
Scott Kazmir (2003)
Doug Mientkiewicz (2005)
Melvin Mora (1998) MLB All-Star
Guillermo Mota (1993)
Daniel Murphy (2007, 2010, 2015) 3 x MLB All-Star
Angel Pagan (2002-2003, 2008–2009, 2011)
Oliver Perez (2009-2010)
Jose Reyes (2002, 2004, 2010) 4 x MLB All-Star; 2011 NL Batting Title
Benito Santiago (2005) 5 x MLB All-Star; 1987 NL rookie of the Year
Pete Schourek (1989)
Steve Trachsel (2005)
Justin Turner (2013) MLB All-Star
Jose Valentin (2007-2008)
Fernando Vina (1992) MLB All-Star
Billy Wagner (2009) 7 x MLB All-Star
Ty Wigginton (2004) MLB All-Star
Preston Wilson (1996-1997) MLB All-Star
David Wright (2003, 2011, 2015) 7 x MLB All-Star

References

External links

Inside Pitch Magazine Online

New York Mets minor league affiliates
Port St. Lucie, Florida
Professional baseball teams in Florida
Baseball teams established in 1988
1988 establishments in Florida
Florida State League teams